Windermere is a town in Orange County, Florida, United States. As of the 2020 census, the town population was 3,030. It is part of the Orlando Metropolitan Statistical Area.

History
A Post Office opened at Windermere in 1888. The Post Office closed in 1901, and reopened in 1911. Windermere was established as a residential development in 1889 and chartered in 1925. 

During late 2007, the Town of Windermere filed a proposal to annex Isleworth and Butler Bay, both wealthy subdivisions. This was met with extensive debate from town residents and an objection from Orange County, which stood to lose millions of dollars of property tax revenue. After lengthy discussions, and battles with the county, Isleworth remained unincorporated, but Butler Bay was annexed into Windermere, with over 90% of its residents approving annexation via a mail-in ballot.

Geography

Climate

The record high temperature in Windermere is 101 °F, which took place in 1998, and the record low temperature is 19 °F, which took place in 1985.

Demographics

As of the census estimate of 2013, there were 2,855 people, 784 households, and 591 families residing in the town. The racial makeup of the town was 95.68% White, 1.3% Black, 0.05% Native Americans, 2.00% Asian, 0.32% from other races, and 0.69% from two or more races. Hispanic or Latino of any race were 3.53% of the population.

There were 704 households, out of which 36.9% had children under the age of 18 living with them, 70.3% were married couples living together, 6.5% had a female householder with no husband present, and 20.2% were non-families. 17.3% of all households were made up of individuals, and 6.7% had someone living alone who was 65 years of age or older.  The average household size was 2.69 and the average family size was 3.05.

In the town 27.5% of the population was under the age of 18, 5.1% was from 18 to 24, 25.8% from 25 to 44, 30.5% from 45 to 64, and 11.1% was 65 years of age or older.  The median age was 41 years. For every 100 females, there were 104.2 males.  For every 100 females age 18 and over, there were 96.3 males.

The median income for a household in the town was $88,809, and the median income for a family was $105,737. Males had a median income of $80,693 versus $37,321 for females. The per capita income for the town was $51,370.  About 2.4% of families and 3.1% of the population were below the poverty line, including 3.0% of those under age 18 and 9.1% of those age 65 or over.

Types of households in Windermere, Florida in 2015–2019. 75.6% married couples families, 2.2% was Cohabiting couples, 12% male householder no spouse, 10.2% female householder no spouse.

Government

Windermere has a Town Manager / City Council form of government. Five council members are elected at large for two-year terms with three running for election in odd years and two running for election in even years along with the mayor. Gary Bruhn has served as mayor for seven consecutive terms since 2004.

Police services are provided by the Windermere Police Department. In January 2014, the department's former chief, Daniel Saylor was sentenced to eight years in prison for perjury. He had lied to the court in order to protect a friend who was found guilty of raping children and sentenced to life in prison. Saylor had pleaded guilty to other charges in 2011, earning him a year in jail.

Fire rescue and emergency medical services are provided by the Ocoee Fire Department. Postal services are provided by the Windermere Post Office. The Floridan Aquifer is Windermere and Orange County's source of drinking and fire hydrant water, which is filtered naturally through hundreds of feet of sand and rock, and then treated by the Orange County Water Division.

Education

The community is within Orange County Public Schools (OCPS). Residents of the city itself are served by Windermere Elementary School, Gotha Middle School, and Olympia High School.

Windermere Preparatory School, a private, coeducational PK–12 college preparatory school, is in nearby Lake Butler.

The town of Windermere will not be within the attendance boundaries of Windermere High School, a Lake Butler high school scheduled to open in 2017. The Windermere town council opposed the naming on the grounds that area residents may mistakenly confuse the school with Windermere Preparatory. Some OCPS board members also argued the school should not be named for a community it will not be located in; they stated that not very many students from the town of Windermere will go to Windermere High.

Transportation

Windermere is located on an isthmus between several lakes in the Lake Butler chain. As such, it is on the shortest road route between the east and west sides of the chain. In fact, the next crossing to the south is  distant at Lake Buena Vista, where County Road 535 (CR 535) and Apopka-Vineland Road meet.

Windermere regulates traffic and encourages traffic to use alternate routes.  In 2004, two roundabouts were installed downtown with the largest public works project in the town's history. This has greatly improved traffic flow and relieved cut through traffic. A third roundabout was completed in August 2010 at the intersection of Park Avenue and Maguire Road. This is at the Windermere Elementary School intersection. All roads in the downtown area (laid out in a grid) are dirt roads except for a few through roads:
Main Street from the northern boundary (as Maguire Road, which heads north to Ocoee) south to 12th Street; the pavement turns west at 12th Street onto Chase Road, which connects to CR 535
Sixth Avenue east from Main Street to the town line, where it becomes Conroy-Windermere Road
Second Avenue west from Main Street (serves a peninsula)
"Dirt Main Street", just west of Main Street (opposite where the railroad used to run), from Third Avenue to Seventh Avenue
Several other paved roads exist in the outskirts, in areas that have been annexed since the original town was formed.

Until the 1980s, Main Street north of Sixth Avenue and Sixth Avenue east of Main Street were maintained by the Florida Department of Transportation (FDOT) as part of State Road 439. This was given to Orange County as County Road 439 (CR 439), and Orange County eventually removed all signs and gave the part inside Windermere to the town. Signs put up by FDOT still mark the north end of CR 439 at SR 50, but no other signs exist, in part because Orange County has a general policy of not signing county roads.

The Florida Midland Railroad, part of the Atlantic Coast Line Railroad, used to run just west of Main Street; there is now a large grassy area between Main Street and the dirt road (often called Dirt Main Street) that ran just west of the railroad. Windermere had a station on the railroad.

Notable people

Michael Ammar, magician
Millie Bobby Brown, actress
Vince Carter, professional basketball player
Johnny Damon, former professional baseball player
Jay Garner, retired general
Dee Gordon, professional baseball player
Rick Goings, chairman and chief executive officer of Tupperware Brands Corporation
Ken Griffey Jr., Hall of Fame former professional baseball player
Adam Haseley, professional baseball player
Grant Hill, former professional basketball player 
 Skip Kendall, professional golfer 
 Gugu Liberato, TV presenter
 Brad Miller, professional baseball player
Julianne Morris, actress
Shaquille O'Neal, former professional basketball player
David A. Siegel, founder of Westgate Resorts, owner of the Versailles house, and former owner of the Orlando Predators
Jackie Siegel, model and actress, owner and director of Mrs. Florida America beauty pageant
Trevor Siemian, professional football player
Philip Michael Thomas, actor and musician
Mark Tremonti, musician for the rock bands Alter Bridge, Creed, and Tremonti
Llandel Veguilla, reggaeton artist, Wisin y Yandel
Bubba Watson, professional golfer
Jason Williams, former professional basketball player
Jesse Winker, professional baseball player
Tiger Woods, professional golfer

See also
1890 Windermere School
Cal Palmer Memorial Building
Windermere Town Hall

References

External links
Town of Windermere Official Website

 
Towns in Orange County, Florida
Populated places established in 1889
Greater Orlando
Towns in Florida